The Orthodox Church of St. Michael and St. Constantine is a Russian Orthodox church in Vilnius, Lithuania. It was built in 1913 to commemorate the 300th anniversary of the Romanov dynasty. It was built by I. Kolesnikov, and incorporates the Rostov and Suzdal architectural styles. On its consecration day of May 13, the church was visited by the former royal figure Grand-Duchess Elizabeth Feodorovna. She was known at the time of consecration as Sister Elizaveta and is now a martyr within the Russian Orthodox Church.

References

External links
church listing at orthodoxy.lt (Russian language text)
 historic photograph of the church

Eastern Orthodox churches in Lithuania
Churches in Vilnius
Church buildings with domes
Russian Orthodox cathedrals in Europe
Churches completed in 1913